Saulzais-le-Potier is a commune in the Cher department in the Centre-Val de Loire region of France.

Geography
The A71 autoroute runs through the middle of the commune’s territory. Saulzais-le-Potier was the seat of the canton of Saulzais-le-Potier, until it was disbanded in 2015.

Population

Sights
 The church, rebuilt in the nineteenth century.
 The eighteenth-century chateau of Mazière.
 The chateau of Champmatouin.
 The eighteenth-century chateau of La Lande and its park.

See also
Communes of the Cher department

References

External links

Annuaire Mairie website 

Communes of Cher (department)